Specchia is a town and comune in the province of Lecce in the Apulia region of southeast Italy. Located 53 km south of the province's capital, Specchia is nestled atop the Serra Magnone, one of the highest points in lower Salento. The town was named among the Most Beautiful Villages in Italy (Borghi più Belli d'Italia) by the National Tourism Association.

Main sights
Mother Church (15th century)
Church of the Francescani Neri (early 16th century)
Baroque church of Assunta
Church of San Nicola di Mira, founded in the 11th century but largely rebuilt in the 16th century, when it was converted to the Latin rite from the Byzantine one
Church of Santa Eufemia (9th-10th century)
Dominican church and convent
Palazzo Risolo (16th century), occupying the former site of the medieval castle
Palazzo Ripa (17th century)

Sport

Football 
The football team of the town is the A.S.D. ARMANDO PICCHI SPECCHIA that competes in the "girone B magliese" of the Seconda Categoria. It was founded in the 1970.

International relations
Specchia is twinned with:
 Busko-Zdrój
 Szigetszentmiklós

References

External links
Awarded "EDEN - European Destinations of Excellence" non traditional tourist destination 2007

Cities and towns in Apulia
Localities of Salento